Cauldwell may refer to:

Places
Cauldwell, Bedford, England
Cauldwell, Derbyshire, England

People
Brendan Cauldwell (1922–2006), Irish radio, film and television actor
David O. Cauldwell (1897–1959), American sexologist
William Cauldwell (1824-1907), American publisher

See also 
Caldwell (disambiguation)